The 2022 Forge FC season was the fourth season in the history of Forge FC. In addition to the Canadian Premier League, the club competed in the 2022 Canadian Championship and the previously delayed final of the 2020 Canadian Championship.

Forge FC began its season in February by competing against Mexican club Cruz Azul in the CONCACAF Champions League, becoming the first Canadian Premier League club to play in the competition.

On October 30, Forge FC defeated Atlético Ottawa 2–0 in the 2022 Canadian Premier League Final to claim their third CPL title.

Final squad

Transfers

In

Loans in

Draft picks 
Forge FC made the following selections in the 2022 CPL–U Sports Draft. Draft picks are not automatically signed to the team roster. Only those who are signed to a contract will be listed as transfers in.

Out

Loans out

Club
On January 2, Forge FC reorganized its ownership under the newly announced Hamilton Sports Group, an entity that also took over the ownership of the Hamilton Tiger-Cats and the master licence for Tim Hortons Field. Bob Young continued as the club's chairman and largest shareholder while also welcoming new investment from Hamilton-based steel company Stelco (represented by its chairman and CEO Alan Kestenbaum), club CEO Scott Mitchell, and Woodbine Entertainment CEO Jim Lawson.

Kits
Forge FC unveiled its 2022 home kit on March 17 and away kit on March 31. The 2022 CONCACAF Champions League began before the new kits were unveiled, requiring the club to continue to wear its 2021 kit for its matches in the competition.

Supplier: Macron / Sponsor: Tim Hortons

Pre-season and friendlies
Forge FC split its pre-season, playing friendlies both before and after the club's CONCACAF Champions League matches against Cruz Azul.

Competitions
Matches are listed in Hamilton local time: Eastern Daylight Time (UTC−4) from March 13 until November 5, and Eastern Standard Time (UTC−5) otherwise.

Overview

Canadian Premier League

Table

Results by match

Matches

Playoff matches

2020 Canadian Championship 

The 2020 Canadian Championship Final was delayed nearly two years due to the COVID-19 pandemic.

2022 Canadian Championship

CONCACAF Champions League

Round of 16

Statistics

Squad and statistics 

|-

|-
! colspan="14" | Player(s) on loan but featured this season
|-

|-
! colspan="14" | Player(s) transferred out during this season
|-

|-
|}

Goal scorers

Clean sheets

Disciplinary record

Honours

Canadian Premier League Awards

Monthly Awards

References

External links 
Official site

2022
2022 Canadian Premier League
Canadian soccer clubs 2022 season
2022 CONCACAF Champions League participants seasons